RNA activation (RNAa) is a small RNA-guided and Argonaute (Ago)-dependent gene regulation phenomenon in which promoter-targeted short double-stranded RNAs (dsRNAs) induce target gene expression at the transcriptional/epigenetic level. RNAa was first reported in a 2006 PNAS paper by Li et al. who also coined the term "RNAa" as a contrast to RNA interference (RNAi) to describe such gene activation phenomenon. dsRNAs that trigger RNAa have been termed small activating RNA (saRNA). Since the initial discovery of RNAa in human cells, many other groups have made similar observations in different mammalian species including human, non-human primates, rat and mice, plant  and C. elegans, suggesting that RNAa is an evolutionarily conserved mechanism of gene regulation.

RNAa can be generally classified into two categories: exogenous and endogenous. Exogenous RNAa is triggered by artificially designed saRNAs which target non-coding sequences such as the promoter and the 3’ terminus  of a gene and these saRNAs can be chemically synthesized  or expressed as short hairpin RNA (shRNA). Whereas for endogenous RNAa, upregulation of gene expression is guided by naturally occurring endogenous small RNAs such as miRNA in mammalian cells  and C. elegans, and 22G RNA in C. elegans.

Mechanism 
The molecular mechanism of RNAa is not fully understood.  Similar to RNAi, it has been shown that mammalian RNAa requires members of the Ago clade of Argonaute proteins, particularly Ago2, but possesses kinetics distinct from RNAi. In contrast to RNAi, promoter-targeted saRNAs induce prolonged activation of gene expression associated with epigenetic changes. It is currently suggested that saRNAs are first loaded and processed by an Ago protein to form an Ago-RNA complex which is then guided by the RNA to its promoter target. The target can be a non-coding transcript overlapping the promoter or the chromosomal DNA. The RNA-loaded Ago then recruits other proteins such as RHA, also known as nuclear DNA helicase II, and CTR9 to form an RNA-induced transcriptional activation (RITA) complex. RITA can directly interacts with RNAP II to stimulate transcription initiation and productive transcription elongation which is related to increased ubiquitination of H2B.

Endogenous RNAa 
In 2008, Place et al. identified targets for miRNA miR-373 on the promoters of several human genes and found that introduction of miR-373 mimics into human cells induced the expression of its predicted target genes. This study provided the first example that RNAa could be mediated by naturally occurring non-coding RNA (ncRNA). In 2011, Huang et al. further demonstrated in mouse cells that endogenous RNAa mediated by miRNAs functions in a physiological context and is possibly exploited by cancer cells to gain a growth advantage. Since then, a number of miRNAs have been shown to upregulate gene expression by targeting gene promoters  or enhancers, thereby, exerting important biological roles. A good example is miR-551b-3p which is overexpressed in ovarian cancer due to amplification. By targeting the promoter of STAT3 to increase its transcription, miR-551b-3p confers to ovarian cancer cells resistance to apoptosis and a proliferative advantage.

In C. elegans hypodermal seam cells, the transcription of lin-4 miRNA is positively regulated by lin-4 itself which binds to a conserved lin-4 complementary element in its promoter, constituting a positive autoregulatory loop.

In C. elegans, Argonaute CSR-1 interacts with 22G small RNAs derived from RNA-dependent RNA polymerase and antisense to germline-expressed transcripts to protect these mRNAs from Piwi-piRNA mediated silencing via promoting epigenetic activation.

It is currently unknown how widespread gene regulation by endogenous RNAa is in mammalian cells. Studies have shown that both miRNAs  and Ago proteins (Ago1)  bind to numerous sites in human genome, especially promoter regions, to exert a largely positive effect on gene transcription.

Applications 
RNAa has been used to study gene function in lieu of vector-based gene overexpression. Studies have demonstrated RNAa in vivo and its potential therapeutic applications in treating cancer and non-cancerous diseases.

In June 2016, UK-based MiNA Therapeutics announced the initiation of a phase I trial of the first-ever saRNA drug MTL-CEBPA in patients with liver cancer, in an attempt to activate CEBPA gene.

References

Further reading

External links 
RNAa FAQs Li Lab, University of California San Francisco
How to get your genes switched on. New Scientist 16 November 2006

RNA
Gene expression